Garden City is the third studio album by John Tesh, released by Cypress Records in 1989.

Track listing

Personnel 

Musicians
 John Tesh – Synclavier DMS with MACII, Kurzweil K250 and K250 XP, E-mu Emulator II+, E-mu Emulator III, Yamaha TX816, Korg M1 and Sampling Grand, Oberheim DPX-1, Synclavier drums (3)
 Michael Hanna – additional keyboards
 Terrence Elliot – acoustic guitars, electric guitars
 Tim Landers – fretless bass (4, 6, 7, 9), 5-string bass (4, 6, 7, 9)
 George Perilli – drums, percussion
 Vince Denham – sax solo (3, 8)
 Tom Scott – sax solo (5)
 Toots Thielemans – harmonica solo (4, 9)

Vocalists
 Diana DeWitt – lead vocals (5), backing vocals (5, 7)
 Michael McDonald – backing vocals (5)
 Donna McElroy – backing vocals (5, 7)
 Chuck Sabatino – backing vocals (5)
 Chris Chandler, Michael Hanna, Calvin Loser and John Tesh – "shock" voices

Production 
 Michael Hanna – producer 
 John Tesh – producer, engineer 
 Ross Pallone – engineer, mixing 
 Calvin Loser – assistant engineer 
 Doug Sax – mastering at The Mastering Lab (Hollywood, California) 
 Recorded on the Synclavier Digital Music System and Sony 3324 Digital Multitrack.
 Kelly Smith – art direction, design 
 Peter Darley Miller – photography 

Information for musicians and production taken from liner notes

References

1989 albums
John Tesh albums
A&M Records albums